Zaqiel (Aramaic: סתראנל, Greek: ‘Ρρκειήλ) was the 15th Watcher of the 20 leaders of the 200 fallen angels that are mentioned in an ancient work called the Book of Enoch. The name is believed to mean "favored by El" (zaqaq-el). The Ethiopian text reads "Zavebe"; Michael Knibb translates his name in the Ethiopic Book Of Enoch as being "God has hidden" or "God has protected".

See also
 List of angels in theology

Watchers (angels)